The Liberty Lady Flames softball team represents Liberty University in NCAA Division I college softball. The team participates in the ASUN Conference. The Lady Flames are currently led by head coach Dot Richardson. The team plays its home games at Liberty Softball Field located on the university's campus.

Year-by-year results

See also
List of NCAA Division I softball programs

References

External links